Luis Saslavsky (April 21, 1903 – March 20, 1995) was an Argentine film director, screenwriter and film producer, and one of the influential directors in the Cinema of Argentina of the classic era.

Personal life
Saskavsky was born in Rosario, Santa Fe, Argentina, to a Jewish family.

Career
He directed and wrote over 40 films between 1931 and 1979. He directed films such as Crimen a las tres in 1935 and wrote for films such as Allá en el Norte in 1973. He retired from the industry in 1979.

Death
He died in Buenos Aires, aged 91.

Filmography
 La fuga (1937)
 Black Crown
 Closed Door (1939)
 The House of Memories
 Démoniaque
 Ashes to the Wind (1942)
 Man to Man Talk
 Crimen a las tres
 The Phantom Lady (1945)
 Road of Hell (1946)
 Passport to Rio (1948)
 Story of a Bad Woman (1948)
 Stain in the Snow (1954)
This Desired Body (1959)
 The Balcony of the Moon (1962)

References

External links
 

1903 births
1995 deaths
Argentine film directors
Male screenwriters
Argentine film producers
Jewish Argentine writers
20th-century Argentine screenwriters
20th-century Argentine male writers